Bioeconomics may refer to:

 Bioeconomics (fisheries), the study of the dynamics of living resources using economic models
 Bioeconomics (biophysical), the study of economic systems applying the laws of thermodynamics
 Biological economics, the study of the relationship between human biology and economics
 Bioeconomics, the social theory of Nicholas Georgescu-Roegen